María Florencia Peña (born 7 November 1974) is an Argentine actress. She played Mónica Argento in the sitcom Casados con hijos (2005–2006).

Filmography

Television

Theater

Movies

Television Programs

Awards and nominations

References

External links 
 

1974 births
Living people
Argentine women comedians
Actresses from Buenos Aires
Argentine television actresses
Argentine film actresses
Argentine stage actresses
Argentine musical theatre actresses
Argentine musical theatre female dancers
Argentine musical theatre women singers
Argentine musical theatre producers
Bailando por un Sueño (Argentine TV series) participants
Bailando por un Sueño (Argentine TV series) judges